Armando Christian Pérez (born January 15, 1981), better known by his stage name Pitbull, is a Grammy award-winning rapper, songwriter, and record producer.

American Music Awards

|-
| style="text-align:center;" rowspan="2"| 2011
| rowspan="2"|Pitbull
|  Favorite Pop/Rock Male Artist
| 
|-
| Favorite Latin Artist
| 
|-
| style="text-align:center;" rowspan="2"| 2012
| rowspan="2"|Pitbull
|  Favorite Pop/Rock Male Artist
| 
|-
| Favorite Latin Artist
| 
|-

ALMA Awards

|-
| style="text-align:center;"|2009
| Pitbull
|Best of the Year in Music
| 
|-
| style="text-align:center;"|2011
| Pitbull
|Favorite Male Music Artist
| 
|-
| style="text-align:center;"|2012
| Pitbull
|Favorite Male Music Artist
| 
|-

Billboard Music Awards

|-
|rowspan="2"|2011
||Pitbull
| Top Latin Artist
|
|-
|| "Bon, Bon"
| Top Latin Song
|
|-
|rowspan="5"|2012
||Pitbull
| Top Latin Artist
|
|-
|rowspan="3"| "Give Me Everything"
| Top Radio Song
|
|-
| Top Rap Song
|
|-
| Top Hot 100 Song
|
|-
|| "Bon, Bon"
| Top Latin Song
|
|-
|rowspan="2"|2013
||Pitbull
| Top Rap Artist
|
|-
|| "Bailando Por El Mundo" (with Juan Magan)
| Top Latin Song
|
|-
|rowspan="2"|2014
||Pitbull
|Top Rap Artist
|
|-
||"Timber"
|Top Rap Song
|

Billboard Latin Music Awards

|-
||2009
||Pitbull
| Latin Digital Download Artist of the Year
|
|-
|rowspan="2"|2010
||Pitbull
| Latin Rhythm Airplay Artist of the Year, Solo
|
|-
|| "I Know You Want Me (Calle Ocho)"
| Latin Rhythm Airplay Song of the Year
|
|-
|rowspan="7"|2011
|rowspan="3"|Pitbull
| Social 50
|
|-
| Latin Rhythm Airplay
|
|-
| Latin Rhythm Albums
|
|-
|rowspan="2"| "Bon, Bon"
| Latin Digital Download of the Year
|
|-
| Latin Rhythm Airplay
|
|-
|| "Armando"
| Latin Rhythm Albums
|
|-
|| "I Like It" (with Enrique Iglesias)
| Hot Latin Song of the Year, Vocal Event
|
|-
|rowspan="10"|2012
|rowspan="4"|Pitbull
| Songs Artist of the Year, Male
|
|-
| Latin Rhythm Song Solo Artist of the Year
|
|-
| Latin Rhythm Album Solo Artist of the Year
|
|-
| Latin Pop Songs Solo Artist of the Year
|
|-
|rowspan="4"| "Give Me Everything"
| Latin Pop Song of the Year
|
|-
| Vocal Event Song of the Year
|
|-
| Song of the Year
|
|-
| Airplay Song of the Year
|
|-
|| "Armando"
| Latin Rhythm Album of the Year
|
|-
|| "Bon, Bon"
| Digital Song of the Year
|
|-
|rowspan="9"|2013
|rowspan="5"|Pitbull
| Song Artist of the Year, Male
|
|-
| Streaming Artist of the Year
|
|-
| Social Artist of the Year
|
|-
| Latin Rhythm Song of the Year, Solo
|
|-
| Latin Rhythm Album of the Year, Solo
|
|-
|rowspan="4"| "Bailando Por El Mundo"  (with Juan Magan)
| Song of the Year
|
|-
| Vocal Event Song of the Year
|
|-
| Airplay Song of the Year
|
|-
| Latin Rhythm Song of the Year
|
|-
|rowspan="1"|2014
|rowspan="1"|Pitbull
| Social Artist of the Year
|
|-
|rowspan="3"|2016
|rowspan="1"|Pitbull
|Latin Rhythm Albums Artist of the Year, Solo
|
|-
|rowspan="1"|Pitbull & Enrique Iglesias
|Tour of the Year
|
|-
|rowspan="1"|"Dale"
| Latin Rhythm Album of the Year
|
|-
|rowspan="2"|2017
|rowspan="1"|Pitbull
|Latin Rhythm Albums Artist of the Year, Solo
|
|-
|rowspan="1"|“El Taxi” (with Sensato, Lil Jon & Osmani Garcia)
|Digital Song of the Year
|
|-
|rowspan="1"|2018
|rowspan="1"|Pitbull & Enrique Iglesias
|Tour of the Year
|
|-

BMI Awards

|-
|rowspan="2"|2012
|rowspan="2"|I Like It" (with Enrique Iglesias)
| Latin Songwriter of the Year
|
|-
| BMI Latin Award – Winning Song
|
|-

Grammy Awards

|-
| style="text-align:center;"|2016
| Dale
| Best Latin Rock, Urban or Alternative Album
| 
|-

iHeartRadio Music Awards

|-
| rowspan= "1" style="text-align:center;"|2015
| "Timber" ft. Kesha
| Best Collaboration
| 
|-
| rowspan= "1" style="text-align:center;"|2016
| Himself
| Latin Artist of the Year
| 
|-
| rowspan= "1" style="text-align:center;"|2017
|"Ay Mi Dios" ft. IAmChino, Yandel and El Chacal
| Latin Song of the Year
| 
|-

Latin American Music Awards

|-
| style="text-align:center;" rowspan="2"|2015
|"Como Yo le Doy" ft. Don Miguelo
| Favorite Collaboration
| 
|-
|"Back It Up" ft. Jennifer Lopez & Prince Royce
|Favorite Dance Song
| 
|-
| style="text-align:center;" rowspan="2"|2016
| rowspan="2"|"Dale
| Album of the Year
| 
|-
| Favorite Urban Album
| 
|-
| style="text-align:center;" rowspan="2"|2017
| rowspan="1"|Himself
| Dick Clark Achievement Award
| 
|-

Latin Music Italian Awards

|-
| style="text-align:center;" rowspan="2"|2012
| "Dance Again" ft. Jennifer Lopez
| Best Latin Song of the Year
| 
|-
| Pitbull
| Best Latin Male Artist of the Year
| 
|-
| style="text-align:center;" rowspan="1"|2013
| "Feel This Moment" ft. Christina Aguilera
| Best Latin Song of the Year
| 
|-
| rowspan="9" |2014
|"We Are One (Ole Ola)" ft. Jennifer Lopez & Claudia Leitte
|Best Latin Song of the Year
|
|-
|"Timber" ft. Kesha
|Best Latin Male Video of the Year
|
|-
| rowspan="2" |"Love You Te Quiero" ft. Belinda
|Best Latin Female Video of the Year
|
|-
|rowspan="3" |Best Latin Dance of the Year
|
|-
|"Fireball"
|
|-
|"I’m a Freak" ft. Enrique Iglesias
|
|-
|"Can’t Get Enough" ft. Becky G
|Best Latin Collaboration of the Year
|
|-
| "Yo quiero" ft. Gente De Zona
|Best Latin Tropical Song of the Year
|
|-
| Pitbull
| Best Latin Male Artist of the Year
| 
|-
| rowspan="9" |2015
|"Time Of Our Lives" ft. Ne Yo
|rowspan="2" |Best Latin Dance of the Year
|
|-
|rowspan="4" |"Back It Up" ft. Jennifer Lopez & Prince Royce
|
|-
|Best Latin Male Video of the Year
|
|-
|Best Latin Song of The Year
|
|-
|rowspan="2" |Best Latin Collaboration of the Year
|
|-
|rowspan="2" |"El Taxi" ft. Osmani Garcia, Sensato
|
|-
|Best Latin Urban Song of the Year
|
|-
|"Dale
|Best Latin Male Album of The Year
|
|-
| Pitbull
| Best Latin Male Artist of the Year
| 
|-
| rowspan="4" |2016
|"Ay Mi Dios" ft. IMChino, Yandel, Chacal
|rowspan="1" |Best Latin Urban Song of The Year
|
|-
|"Greenlight" ft. Flo Rida
|rowspan="1" |Best Latin Dance of the Year
|
|-
|rowspan="2" | Pitbull
| Best Latin Male Artist of the Year
| 
|-
| Artist Saga
| 
|-
| rowspan="1" |2017
|"Hey Ma" ft. Camila Cabello & J Balvin
|rowspan="1" |Best Latin Collaboration of the Year
|
|-

Latin Grammy Awards

|-
| style="text-align:center;" rowspan="2"|2011
| "Armando"
| Best Urban Music Album
| 
|-
| "Bon, Bon"
| Best Urban Song
| 
|-
| style="text-align:center;"|2012
| "Crazy People" (with Sensato)
| Best Urban Song
|
|-
|style="text-align:center;" rowspan="1"|2013
|rowspan="1"|Echa Pa'lla (Manos Pa'rriba)
| Best Urban Performance
|
|-
|  style="text-align:center;"|2017
| "Hey Ma (Spanish Version)" (with J Balvin & Camila Cabello)
| Best Urban Song
|
|-

Los Premios MTV

|-
| style="text-align:center;"|2009
| Pitbull
| Best MTV Tr3's Artist
| 
|-

MP3 Music Awards

|-
||2009
|| "I Know You Want Me (Calle Ocho)"
| Best Latin Song
|
|-

MTV Video Music Awards

|-
||2010
||I Like It
| Best Electronic Dance Video
|
|-
|rowspan="2"|2011
|rowspan="2"|Give Me Everything
| Best Collaboration
|
|-
| Best Pop Video
|
|-
||2012
||Pitbull
| Best Latino Artist
|
|-
|rowspan="2"|2013
||Pitbull
| Best Latino Artist
|
|-
||Feel This Moment
| Best Collaboration
|
|-
||2014
||Timber
| Best Collaboration
|

MTV Europe Music Awards

|-
|rowspan="2"|2011
||Pitbull
| Best Hip Hop
|
|-
|| "On the Floor" (with Jennifer Lopez)
| Best Song
|
|-
|rowspan="2"|2012
||Pitbull
| Best Male
|
|-
|| International Love
| Best Song
|
|-

MTV Video Music Awards Japan

|-
| style="text-align:center;"|2013
| Back in Time
| Best Video from a Film
| 
|-
| style="text-align:center;"|2014
| "Live It Up" (with Jennifer Lopez)
| Best Collaboration Video
|

MuchMusic Video Awards

|-
|rowspan="2"|2011
|| "On the Floor" (with Jennifer Lopez)
| International Video of the Year
|
|-
|| "DJ Got Us Fallin' in Love" (with Usher)
| Most Watched Video
|
|-
| style="text-align:center;"|2012
| Give Me Everything (with Ne-Yo)
| International Video of the Year
| 
|-

Nickelodeon Kids' Choice Awards

|-
|rowspan="1" style="text-align:center;"|2014
|Pitbull
|Favorite Male Singer
| 
|-

Nickelodeon Kids' Choice Awards Colombia

|-
|rowspan="1"|2017
|"Hey Ma"
|Favorite Collaboration
|
|}

Nickelodeon Kids' Choice Awards México

|-
|rowspan="1"|2017
|"Hey Ma"
|Favorite Collaboration
|
|}

Meus Prêmios Nick
The Meus Prêmios Nick is an annual awards show that awards entertainers with a blimp trophy, as voted by kids on internet.

!
|-
| 2017
| "Hey Ma"
| Favorite Collaboration
| 
| style="text-align:center;" |
|-
|}

NRJ Music Awards

|-
| style="text-align:center;"|2010
| "I Know You Want Me (Calle Ocho)"
| International Song of the Year
| 
|-
| style="text-align:center;"|2012
| rowspan="2"| Pitbull
| rowspan="2"| International Artist of the Year
| 
|-
| style="text-align:center;"|2013
| 
|-

People's Choice Awards

|-
| style="text-align:center;"|2012
| Pitbull
| Favorite Hip Hop Artist
| 
|-
| style="text-align:center;"|2013
| Pitbull
| Favorite Hip Hop Artist
| 
|-

Premio Lo Nuestro

|-
| style="text-align:center;"|2011
| Pitbull
| Urban & General Artist of the Year
| 
|-
|rowspan="2"|2012
|| Pitbull
| Favorite Hip-Hop Artist
|
|-
|| Armando
| Best Album of the Year
|
|-
|rowspan="2"|2013
|rowspan="2"| "Bailando Por El Mundo"  (with Juan Magan)
|  Urban Song of The Year
|
|-
| Collaboration of the Year
|

Premios Juventud

|-
||2009
|| "Ay Chico (Lengua Afuera)"
| My Favorite Ringtone
|
|-
||2010
| Pitbull
|| The Best Dressed Award
|
|-
|rowspan="6"|2011
|rowspan="2"|Pitbull
| Best Urban Artist
|
|-
| Best Moves
|
|-
||"I Like It" (with Enrique Iglesias)
| The Perfect Combo
|
|-
||On the Floor" (with Jennifer Lopez)
| The Perfect Combo
|
|-
|rowspan="2"| "Bon, Bon"
| Best Song
|
|-
| Best Ringtone
|
|-
|rowspan="7"|2012
|rowspan="3"|Pitbull
| Best Urban Artist
|
|-
| All Over the Dial
|
|-
| Best Moves
|
|-
||"Euphoria" (with Enrique Iglesias)
| My Favorite Concert
|
|-
||Planet Pit
| Everything I touch it
|
|-
|rowspan="2"| "International Love"
| The Perfect Combination
|
|-
| Best Ringtone
|
|-
|rowspan="5"|2013
|rowspan="3"|Pitbull
| Best Urban Artist
|
|-
| All Over the Dial
|
|-
| Best Moves
|
|-
||Planet Pit World Tour
| My Favorite Concert
|
|-
||"Feel This Moment"
| Favorite Hit
|
|-
|rowspan="3"|2014
|-
|rowspan="2"| Pitbull
| Best Urban Artist
|
|-
|Idolo de la Juventud
|
|-
|rowspan="3"|2015
|-
|rowspan="2"| Pitbull
| Best Urban Artist
|
|-
|Tour of the Year (with Enrique Iglesias & J Balvin)
|
|-
|rowspan="1"|2016
|rowspan="1"|"Back it Up" (with Jennifer Lopez & Prince Royce)
|The Perfect Combination
|
|-
|rowspan="1"|2017
|rowspan="1"|"Hey Ma" (with Camila Cabello & J Balvin)
| Best Song For Dancing
|

Los Premios 40 Principales

|-
| style="text-align:center;"|2010
| Pitbull
| Best Latin Artist
| 
|-
|rowspan="5"|2011
||Pitbull
| Best International Artist
|
|-
|| "Give Me Everything"
| Best International Song
|
|-
||"On the Floor" (with Jennifer Lopez)
| Best International Song
|
|-
|rowspan="2"| "Bailando Por El Mundo" (with Juan Magan)
| Best Dance Act
|
|-
| Best Song
|
|-
|rowspan="3"|2012
|rowspan="3"|Pitbull
|Most Influential Latin Artist and Producer
|
|-
| Best Latin Artist
|
|-
| Best Spanish Language International Artist
|
|-

Premios 40 Principales America

|-
| style="text-align:center;"|2012
| Pitbull
| Best Urban Artist
| 
|-

Premios Tu Mundo

|-
|rowspan="2"|2012
||"International Love"
| Party Song
|
|-
||"Bailando Por El Mundo" (with Juan Magan)
| Party Song
|
|-
|rowspan="3"|2013
||"Sin Ti" (with Dyland y Lenny)
| Presents Best Music Video
|
|-
||Pitbull
| I'm Sexy & I Know It
|
|-
||Pitbull (Epic)
| Film Presents: Latino Pride In Hollywood
|
|-

Teen Choice Awards

|-
||2008
|| "The Anthem"
| Rap/Hip-Hop Track
|
|-
|rowspan="2"|2009
||Pitbull
| Rap Artist
|
|-
||"I Like It" (with Enrique Iglesias)
| Hook Up
|
|-
|rowspan="2"|2010
|| Pitbull
| Rap Artist
|
|-
||"I Know You Want Me"
| Rap/Hip-Hop Track
|
|-
|rowspan="3"|2011
|rowspan="2"|Pitbull
| R&B/Hip-Hop Artist
|
|-
| Summer Music Star: Male
|
|-
||"Give Me Everything"
| Single
|
|-
|rowspan="3"|2012
|rowspan="3"|Pitbull
| Male Artist
|
|-
| R&B/Hip-Hop Artist
|
|-
| Summer Music Star: Male
|
|-
|rowspan="4"|2013
|rowspan="3"|Pitbull
| Male Artist
|
|-
| Hip-Hop/Rap Artist
|
|-
| Music Star: Male
|
|-
||"Feel This Moment"  (ft Christina Aguilera)
| Choice Single: Male Artist
|
|-
|rowspan="2"|2014
|Pitbull
|Choice Male Artist
|
|-
|"Mmm Yeah"  (with Austin Mahone)
|Choice Single: Male Artist
|
|-
|2015
|Pitbull
|Choice Male Artist
|
|-
|2016
|"Hey Ma" ft. Camila Cabello & J Balvin
|Choice Latin Song
|
|}

American Academy of Achievement 

In 2019, he received the Golden Plate Award of the American Academy of Achievement during the International Achievement Summit in New York City.

San Diego International Film Festival 

Ceremony will be on October 18, 2019. Previous winners include Kenny Loggins.

References

Pitbull